The 2013 Campeonato Acreano was the 67th season of the Campeonato Acreano, the top professional football league of the state of Acre. Plácido de Castro were champions for the 1st time. The championship started 17 February 2013, and ended on 26 May.

Format
The first stage is in double round-robin. The best four teams qualify to Final Stage.

The champion and the runner-up qualify to the 2014 Copa do Brasil. The champion also qualifies to the 2013 Campeonato Brasileiro Série D

As Independência withdrawn its participation, they were replaced by Alto Acre Futebol Club.

Teams

First stage

Final stage

Rio Branco and Plácido de Castro qualified for 2013 Copa do Brasil

References

Acreano
Campeonato Acreano seasons